Sinister Visions is a 2013 American horror anthology film directed by Henric Brandt, Doug Gehl, Andreas Rylander and Kim Sønderholm, starring Sønderholm, Kat Herlo,        Toke Lars Bjarke, David C. Hayes and Stefan Jonason.

Cast
 Kat Herlo as Emma
 Toke Lars Bjarke as Tommy
 David C. Hayes as Charles
 Kim Sønderholm as Martin/Carl/Richard
 Stefan Jonason as Keith

Reception
The film received a rating of 3.5 out of 5 in Horror Society. The film received a mixed review in HorrorNews.net.

Jeremy Blitz of DVD Talk wrote a negative review of the film, writing that "Everything about Sinister Visions is haphazard. Some segments have top notch acting, effects, and story. Others (like Succubus) have super cheesy (though still fun) effects, and little story to speak of. Still others, like Genital Genocide, have great effects that work to no comprehensible end."

References

External links
 
 

American horror films
2013 horror films